The Fun, the Luck & the Tycoon is a 1990 Hong Kong comedy film directed by Johnnie To. It starred Chow Yun-fat, Sylvia Chang, Nina Li Chi and Lawrence Cheng. It is an adaptation of Coming to America.

Synopsis
Lam Po Sang (Chow Yun-fat) was born into a wealthy family. He is the richest man in Hong Kong, rich enough to build a space station. Sang lives in a luxury villa served by many maids. He is envied and worshiped by millions. However, he does not enjoy his lifestyle. He also does not want to follow his grandaunt's (Ouyang Sha-fei) arranged marriage between him and his cousin Cindy (Nina Li Chi) because his property would belong to her. He just wants to live a happy life. While his grandaunt was not home, Sang disguises as a civilian and runs away.

At a charity gala, Sang work as a handyman where he meets Hung Yeung-yuk (Sylvia Chang), the younger sister of Hung Tung-tung Food Company's boss Mr. Hung (Ha Yu). Sang was attracted by Yuk's wisdom and beauty and he falls in love. Sang becomes an employee at their restaurant to get close to Yuk with the help of his loyal butler Fatso (Wong San). This causes Hung's plan to match-make her sister with wealthy man Jimmy Chiu (Lawrence Cheng) to fail.

With his new life, Sang becomes energetic. While working at the restaurant, he gets to know the smart little kid Rocky (Wong Kwan-yuen) and four strong-willed brothers (Beyond) whom are his colleagues. Sang wins Yuk's love. However, Jimmy, Cindy and Tung do not let things go smoothly, and when Sang's grandaunts expose Sang who he is to Yuk, she storms off. After many misunderstandings, Sang and Yuk end up together.

Cast
Chow Yun-fat as Lam Po Sang / Stink (2 roles)
Sylvia Chang as Hung Yeung-yuk
Nina Li Chi as Cindy Chan
Lawrence Cheng as Jimmy Chiu
Wong Kwan-yuen as Rocky Ma
Ha Yu as Hung Tung-tung
Beyond as Restaurant workers
Wong San as Fatso
Wong Man as Sang's mother
Ouyang Sha-fei as Sang's grandaunt
Bowie Wu as Barrister Cheung
Raymond Wong as Priest (cameo)
James Lai as Jeweller (cameo)
Fung King-man as Doctor
Ho Ling-ling as Rocky's girlfriend
Yue Ming as Sang's office manager
Lo Hoi-pang as Senior Policeman
Yeung Yau-cheung as Junior Policeman
Albert Lo as Customer at restaurant (brief cameo)
Leung Oi as Customer at restaurant (brief cameo)
Cheng Siu-ping as Woman at office
English Tang
Alan Chui Chung-San as Robber
Ho Wan as Party guest
Leung Hak-shun as Party guest
Ho Chi-moon as Party guest
Lee Wah-kon

Reception

Critical
Andrew Saroch of Far East Films rated the film 3 out of 5 stars and writes "The Fun, The Luck And The Tycoon is not hilarious or particularly side-splitting, but the humour is such that it hits the mark in a subtle manner. Therefore this is an agreeable Chow Yun-fat comedy that is mostly successful in its modest ambitions."

Box office
The film grossed HK$20,292,057 at the Hong Kong box office during its theatrical run from 18 January to 15 February 1990.

See also
Chow Yun-fat filmography
Johnnie To filmography

References

External links

The Fun, the Luck & the Tycoon at Hong Kong Cinemagic

1990 films
1990 romantic comedy films
Hong Kong romantic comedy films
1990s screwball comedy films
Hong Kong slapstick comedy films
Hong Kong remakes of American films
1990s Cantonese-language films
Films directed by Johnnie To
Films set in Hong Kong
Films shot in Hong Kong
1990s Hong Kong films